Renaud cante el' Nord is a studio album by Renaud.
It consists of songs in the Picard language of the northern French region of Nord-Pas-de-Calais.
Some of the songs were composed by Edmond Tanière and Simon Colliez.

Track listing

"Tout in haut de ch'terri"
"El pinsonnée"
"Ch'méneu d’quévaux"
"Les Tomates"
"Le Tango du cachalot"
"Adieu ch'terril d’Rimbert"
"Eun'goutt'ed'jus"
"M'lampiste"
"Y'in a qu'pour li"
"Les molettes"
"I bot un d'mi"
"Dù qu'i sont?"

Track 1 was included on the 2007 compilation The Meilleur of Renaud.

References

External links
 Translations of the songs' texts from patois into standard French

1991 albums
Renaud albums
Virgin Records albums